Fellype Gabriel de Melo e Silva or simply Fellype Gabriel (born December 6, 1985 in Rio de Janeiro), is a Brazilian football attacking midfielder who plays for Boavista in the Brazilian Série D.

He was a member of the Brazil U-20 national team at 2005 FIFA World Youth Championship in the Netherlands. On November 13, 2012, Fellype Gabriel was called up, by Mano Menezes, for seleção brasileira that played the Superclásico de las Américas.

Club statistics
(Correct  February 2, 2013)

according to combined sources on the Flamengo official website and Flaestatística.
In 2009 Fellype Gabriel played for Portuguesa in The Brazilian Série B

Honours

Club
Flamengo
Brazilian Cup: 2006

Kashima Antlers
Xerox Super Cup: 2010
Emperor's Cup: 2010
J. League Cup: 2011

Botafogo
Campeonato Carioca: 2013

Palmeiras
Brazilian Cup: 2015

National Team
Chile Octagonal Tournament: 2005 (U-20)

References

External links

 zerozero.pt
 jornalmadeira
 verdesmares
 soccerterminal

1985 births
Living people
Brazilian expatriate footballers
Brazilian expatriate sportspeople in Portugal
Brazilian expatriate sportspeople in Japan
Brazilian expatriate sportspeople in the United Arab Emirates
Brazilian footballers
Brazil youth international footballers
Brazil under-20 international footballers
Expatriate footballers in Portugal
Expatriate footballers in Japan
Expatriate footballers in the United Arab Emirates
Campeonato Brasileiro Série A players
Campeonato Brasileiro Série B players
Campeonato Brasileiro Série D players
J1 League players
Footballers from Rio de Janeiro (city)
CR Flamengo footballers
C.D. Nacional players
Cruzeiro Esporte Clube players
Associação Portuguesa de Desportos players
Kashima Antlers players
Botafogo de Futebol e Regatas players
Sociedade Esportiva Palmeiras players
CR Vasco da Gama players
Boavista Sport Club players
Association football midfielders